This is a list of the England national under-21 football team results from 1976 to 1999 (Matches 1 – 178).

1970s

1976

1977

1978

1979

1980s

1980

1981

1982

1983

1984

1985

1986

1987

1988

1989

1990s

1990

1991

1992

1993

1994

1995

1996

1997

1998

1999

References 

1970s in England
England national under-21 football team